Cyclonidea is a major genus of medium-sized sea snails, marine gastropod mollusks in the family Eulimidae.

Species
 Cyclonidea carina Laseron, 1956
 Cyclonidea dondani Poppe & Tagaro, 2016
 Cyclonidea labiata (A. Adams, 1860)
 Cyclonidea notabilis Poppe, 2008

References

External links
 Ponder, W. F. (1985). A review of the genera of the Rissoidae (Mollusca: Mesogastropoda: Rissoacea). Records of the Australian Museum. Suppl. 4: 1-221

Eulimidae